This is a list of school districts in New Hampshire.

Special school districts

References

New Hampshire

School districts
School districts